

The Loire 11 was a French three-seat general-purpose monoplane designed and built by Loire Aviation of St. Nazaire.

Design and development
The Loire 11 was the first original design by the company and was designed to meet a requirement for a general-purpose transport for operation in the French colonies. It was a strut-braced high-wing monoplane with three-seats and powered by a  Lorraine Algol radial engine. Only two prototypes were produced in 1930 and the project was abandoned in 1931 when the type failed to interest the French government.

Specifications

References

Notes

Bibliography

1930s French military utility aircraft
011
High-wing aircraft
Single-engined tractor aircraft
Aircraft first flown in 1930